Houguan County is a former County in Fujian province, China that is now mostly part of Minhou County, Fuzhou. Established during the Eastern Han dynasty, it was dissolved soon after the founding of the Republic of China in 1912.

People 

 Chen Menglei, Qing dynasty scholar and author
 Lin Xu, politician executed by the Qing dynasty during Empress Cixi's reign

References

1912 disestablishments in China
History of Fujian
Former counties of China